Ramen is a Japanese dish of noodles in broth.

Ramen may also refer to:

 Instant noodle, sometimes described as ramen.
 Lake Rämen, a lake in Dalarna, Sweden
 R'amen, a word used at the end of prayers in parody religion Pastafarianism
Ramen, fictional characters in The Chronicles of Thomas Covenant by Stephen R. Donaldson

See also

Raman (disambiguation)
Rahman (name)